Vera is a Italian and Spanish surname. Notable persons with that surname include:

 Alejo Vera (1834–1923), Spanish painter
 Alfredo Vera Vera (1910–1999), Ecuadorian politician
 Alfonso Vera (born 1974), Mexican radio and television host
 America Vera Zavala (born 1976), Romanian-born Swedish politician and political writer
 Anastacio Vera (born 1985), Paraguayan footballer
 Ángel Herrera Vera (born 1957), Cuban boxer
 Antonio Vera (born 1986), Spanish footballer
 Arturo Vera (born 1946), Argentine politician
 Augusto Vera (1813–1885), Italian philosopher
 Bernard Vera (born 1950), French politician
 Billy Vera (born 1944), American singer, actor, writer and music historian
 Brandon Vera (born 1977), Filipino-American professional mixed martial artist
 Brian Vera (born 1981), Mexican-American boxer
 Carlos Vera (born 1976), Ecuadorian football referee
 Cris de Vera (1924–1975), Filipino actor
 Cristobal de Vera (1577–1621), Spanish painter
 Dan Vera (first published 2004), Cuban-American poet and editor
 Daniel Bazán Vera (born 1973), Argentine footballer
 Danny Vera (singer) (born 1977), Dutch singer-songwriter
 Danny Vera (footballer) (born 1980), Ecuadorian footballer
 Diego Vera (born 1985), Uruguayan footballer
 Emmanuelle Vera (born 1994), Filipino-American singer-songwriter
 Enrique Vera (born 1979), Paraguayan footballer
 Enrique Vera Ibáñez, (born 1954), Mexican race walker
 Enzo Vera (born 1983), Chilean footballer
 Eusebio Guilarte Vera (1805–1849), Bolivian politician
 Francisco Vera Cabeza de Vaca (1637–1700), Spanish portrait painter
 Fredy Vera (born 1986), Paraguayan footballer
 Gerardo Vera (born 1947), Spanish costume and set designer, actor and director
 Helio Vera (1946–2008), Paraguayan writer, lawyer and journalist
 Ignacio Loyola Vera (born 1954), Mexican politician
 Jacinto Vera (1813–1881), Uruguayan Roman Catholic bishop
 Jaime Vera (born 1963), Chilean footballer and manager
 JC de Vera (born 1986), Filipino actor and model
 Jenaro Gajardo Vera (1919–1998), Chilean lawyer, painter and poet
 Jesús Vera (born 1989), Argentine footballer
 Joey Vera (born 1963), American heavy metal bassist
 Jorge Gutiérrez Vera (first employed 1966), Mexican electrical engineer
 José de Azlor y Virto de Vera (c. 1677–1734), Spanish colonial governor
 José de Jesús Vera (born 1969), Venezuelan footballer
 José Raúl Vera López (born 1945), Mexican Roman Catholic bishop
 José Santos González Vera (1897–1970), Chilean writer
 Juan de Vera (1453–1507), Spanish Roman Catholic cardinal
 Kerry Vera (born 1975), American professional mixed martial artist
 Lissa Vera (born 1982), Argentine singer-songwriter, composer and actress
 Luis Vera (Chilean footballer) (1929–2014), Chilean footballer
 Luis Vera (Venezuelan footballer) (born 1973), Venezuelan footballer
 Luis Fernando Loor Vera (born 1981), Ecuadorian Brazilian jiu-jitsu athlete
 Luis R. Vera (born 1952), Chilean film director, producer, writer and academic
 Luis Santana Vera (born 1991), Ecuadorian footballer
 María Teresa Vera (1895–1965), Cuban singer-songwriter
 Mariano Vera (1780–1840), Argentine politician
 Marlon Vera (born 1992), Ecuadorian mixed martial artist 
 Norge Luis Vera (born 1971), Cuban baseball pitcher
 Oscar Luis Vera (born 1976), Argentine footballer
 Pedro Jorge Vera (1914–1999), Ecuadorian writer and politician
 Pedro González Vera (born 1967), Chilean footballer
 Pedro Vera (born 1984), Paraguayan footballer
 Peter Vera (born 1982), Uruguayan footballer
 Ricardo Vera (born 1962), Uruguayan long-distance runner
 Roberto Martínez Vera-Tudela (born 1967), Peruvian football manager
 Rolando Vera (athlete), (born 1965), Ecuadorian long-distance runner
 Rolando Vera (wrestler) (1915–2001), Mexican professional wrestler
 Rosa Vera, Mexican 1992 Summer Paralympics athlete
 Santiago de Vera, Spanish colonial governor of the Philippines starting 1584
 Santiago Vera-Rivera (born 1950), Chilean composer, teacher and musical researcher
 Saro Vera (1922–2000), Paraguayan religious leader
 Susej Vera (born 1976), Venezuelan actress and model
 Urko Vera (born 1987), Spanish footballer
 Veronica Vera (photographed by Mapplethorpe in 1982), American sexuality writer and actress
 Yvonne Vera (1964–2005), Zimbabwean writer

See also
 Vera (given name)
 Vera (disambiguation)